Andrey Rublev was the defending champion, but lost in the quarterfinals to Botic van de Zandschulp.

Marin Čilić won the title, defeating Taylor Fritz in the final, 7–6(7–3), 4–6, 6–4.

Seeds
The top four seeds received a bye into the second round.

Draw

Finals

Top half

Bottom half

Qualifying

Seeds

Qualifiers

Qualifying draw

First qualifier

Second qualifier

Third qualifier

Fourth qualifier

References

Main draw
Qualifying draw

2021 ATP Tour
2021 Singles